Genesis Israeli Rose Schmitz Briggs Be (born December 5) also known as G.Be, is an American recording artist, painter and activist. She is best known for her work to remove the Confederate Emblem from the MS State Flag. Her work has been featured in Billboard, The Associated Press, Matter of Fact with Soledad Obrien and VICE. She is a scholar of NYU Catherine B. Reynolds Program for Social Entrepreneurship. Genesis is a graduate of NYU's political science department at CAS as well as the Clive Davis Institute of Recorded Music at the Tisch School of the Arts. In 2010 Be accepted a fellowship from The Hip-Hop Education Center at NYU, which was founded by her longtime mentor Martha Diaz.

Early life/family legacy

Genesis Be is the daughter of published author, Ishmael Be and registered nurse Lisa Schmitz Briggs. She is of African American, Hungarian, Jewish and German descent. Raised in Biloxi, MS, Be graduated from Biloxi High School right before Hurricane Katrina devastated her hometown Biloxi, MS. After riding out the storm with her family and aiding in rebuilding efforts, Be portrayed her experience in her second studio album, 18 In America.

Genesis Be is also the grand daughter of civil rights activist Rev. Clyde Briggs and Mary Geraldine Briggs of Roxie, Mississippi. Phillip and Violet Schmitz are Be's grandparents on her mother's side. Genesis accredits her social activist spirit to the legacy of her grandparents and her father. Rev. Clyde Briggs educated and encouraged black citizens to vote in Franklin County during the 1960s. After being accused of smuggling guns into Franklin County to arm black residents against the Ku Klux Klan, Rev. Briggs was murdered at the young age of 42.

Recent activity

In 2019, Genesis Be launched a bicoastal art exhibit titled "People Not Things" and released an album of the same name in January 2020. The same year she continued her work to change the MS State Flag which was removed in June 2020.

In 2017, Genesis Be was the subject of the unreleased documentary "Mississippi Turning" produced by Irshad Manji's Moral Courage Project and executive produced by Aunjanue Ellis & Sarah Silverman. This documentary explores her work to remove the Confederate emblem from the Mississippi state flag and promote racial healing through in-person discourse. Be's work to change the MS State Flag has been covered by The Associated Press & Billboard.

In April 2016, Be made National headlines with a controversial protest of Mississippi's "Confederate Heritage Month". She was the subject of numerous interviews including News One (Pakistani TV channel), Billboard & ABC News. Following the protest she teamed up with actress Aunjanue Ellis & the "Take It Down America" initiative to hold a rally on Capitol Hill regarding the removal of the Confederate Battle Emblem from the canton of the MS State flag.

Be released a new album titled "Gulf Coast Queen" in August 2016.

In the summer of 2013, Be was featured in The Los Angeles Times and The Village Voice for her music video "Tampons & Tylenol". She released her fourth studio album, "Mississippi To Manhattan", on April 19, 2011. Genesis graduated from NYU on May 18, 2011. Be is also the recipient of a Nia Award: Ronald McNair/Arthur Schomburg For Academic Excellence. Genesis accepted a 2011 NYU President's Service Award from John Sexton for her community service in the Gulf Coast Region and for her work in NYC public schools. She currently hosts a radio show on WNYU called "Hip Hop & Her Family" alongside Dj Petra. Be released her 6th full-length project titled "GENESEQUA" in the fall of 2014. She is set to release her latest project titled Poli Trap | The Escape Tape on November 5, 2015. Genesis Be coined the term "Poli Trap" describing it as a subgenre of hip hop that pairs political commentary with trap music

Discography
Singles
 2005: "More Than A Warrior"
 2007: "I Don’t Discriminate"
 2008: "Lovers Or Friends"
 2009: "Precious Beyond Measure"
 2010: "Laughin At Ya Lames"
 2011: "Like A Movie"
 2011: "At A Standstill"
 2013: "Tampons & Tylenol"
 2016: "My GCK"
 2020: "The Edge"

Albums
 2005: 17 In America
 2006: 18 In America
 2007: 19 In America
 2011: Mississippi To Manhattan
 2014: GENESEQUA
 2016: Gulf Coast Queen
 2017: Poli Trap
 2020: People Not Things

References
Associated Press: Rapper Genesis Be’s long battle versus the Confederate flag
ABC News: Rapper Genesis Be’s long battle versus the Confederate flag
Jackson Free Press: Fighting Back In Klan Nation: Rev Clyde Briggs
Gulf Coast Queen Album on Google Play
Genesis Be's Interview on NewsOne with Roland Martin
Genesis Be's Interview on ABC News
Genesis Be Debuts 'My GCK' on Billboard
GENESEQUA Album on iTunes
WNYU Website FM Schedule
Hip Hop & Her Family Website 
The Village Voice: Genesis Be Music Review  June 21, 2013
The L.A. Times: Genesis Be Music Review June 21, 2013
Jackson Free Press: Rev. Clyde Briggs March 31, 2007
The Past Is Never Dead: Briggs, Clyde, pg 67, 73, 118,206
Zora & Alice Magazine  August 6, 2010
Maximus Magazine Fall 2009
Reynolds Scholar 
Nia Awards: Genesis Be. Jeff Rabhan
Washington Square News May 11, 2009
Open Sky Artworks Website 
Strive Till I Rise Website
Ishmael Be "Espylacopa"
AUDIO "Young Brown Fly" from Poli Trap Mixtape
AUDIO "God Speed" from Poli Trap Mixtape
AUDIO People Not Things

External links
Associated Press: Rapper Genesis Be’s long battle versus the Confederate flag
ABC News: Rapper Genesis Be’s long battle versus the Confederate flag
 
Jackson Free Press: Fighting Back In Klan Nation: Rev Clyde Briggs
Moral Courage Project | Subject Genesis Be
Defiant Network Interview | Subject Genesis Be
Genesis Be executive producer of "Wonderland Play"
Genesis Be's Interview on NewsOne with Roland Martin
Genesis Be's Interview on ABC News
Genesis Be Debuts 'My GCK' on Billboard
GENESEQUA Album on iTunes
WNYU Website FM Schedule
Hip Hop & Her Family Website 
The Village Voice: Genesis Be Music Review  June 21, 2013
The L.A. Times: Genesis Be Music Review June 21, 2013
Jackson Free Press: Rev. Clyde Briggs March 31, 2007

Living people
Biloxi High School alumni
Year of birth missing (living people)